The Beardmore Relics are a cache of Viking Age artifacts, said to have been unearthed near Beardmore, Ontario, Canada in the 1930s. The cache consists of a Viking Age sword, an axe head, and a bar of undetermined use (possibly a part of a shield).

It has been claimed that the relics are proof of early Norse occupation of northern Ontario. While the authenticity of the fragments is not generally disputed, their "discovery" in situ in Ontario is considered to be a hoax. In the 1930s, the Royal Ontario Museum (ROM) purchased the relics from the man who supposedly unearthed them. For about twenty years they were prominently displayed by the museum; however, the museum was forced to pull the relics from display following a public enquiry in about 1956–1957. About this time, the son of the supposed discoverer admitted that his father had planted the relics. The provincial museum re-introduced the relics to public display in the 1990s.

Supposed discovery

On 3 December 1936, James Edward Dodd, an amateur prospector and CNR trainman from Port Arthur, Ontario, sold a cache of iron fragments to Charles Trick Currelly, curator of the Royal Ontario Museum (ROM) for a price of $500 CAD. The cache consisted of a broken sword, an axehead, and a bar of unknown use. Dodd claimed that he had unearthed the fragments while prospecting for gold, southwest of Beardmore, Ontario, on 24 May 1931.

According to one version of events, Dodd took the fragments home, thinking they were Indian relics. For a while he kept them in his woodshed, until word of his discovery reached Currelly in Toronto. Currelly accepted Dodd's account, examined the fragments, and was convinced of their authenticity. He sent photographs of them to experts in Europe, who confirmed that they were genuine Norse artifacts. After his purchase of the fragments, Currelly had them displayed in the ROM. Around this time, James Watson Curran, editor of The Sault Ste. Marie Star, stated that the find was proof of a Norse burial in the region. Curran lectured widely on the theme "A Norseman died in Ontario nine hundred years ago" and published a book on the subject.

Mowat's proposed explanation

The Canadian author Farley Mowat, in his Westviking (first published in 1965), speculated that the Beardmore relics, and the Kensington Runestone, were proof of Norse occupation in the region of Ontario and parts of Minnesota. The Kensington Runestone is said to have been found near Kensington, Minnesota, United States by a Swedish American farmer in 1898. It consists of a slab of rock with alleged runes carved into it. The runestone is considered by runologists and Scandinavian language scholars to be a hoax, but its authenticity is believed by some amateur researchers and locals alike.

Mowat considered it likely that the Norse had established a base in the Hudson Strait and that from there could have sailed down into Hudson Bay, further south into James Bay and landed somewhere near the mouth of the Albany River. From this possible landfall, Mowat speculated that an expedition could have traveled by boat to a location near Lake Nipigon. Mowat proposed that such an expedition could have been led by Paul Knutson and that the runes upon the Kensington Runestone related to the death of ten of his followers. Mowat proposed that the Beardmore relics were the remains of a burial and that the Kensington Runestone was originally engraved and left somewhere near the area as the expedition made a hasty northeasterly retreat. He proposed that the runestone could have been found by Indians and later carried off to Minnesota.

Scepticism 

Immediately after the Royal Ontario Museum's purchase of the "relics", Canadian archaeologists and others were dismayed at the museum's endorsement of the fragments, noting discrepancies in Dodd's statements, as well of those of his friends and enemies. Dodd had altered his account several times. John Robert Colombo wrote that “Archaeologists accused Dodd of fraud, suggesting he had purchased the artifacts from an immigrant from Norway and then ‘salted’ them for later ‘discovery’. Amid considerable controversy, the Royal Ontario Museum withdrew the artifacts from public display, and for more than thirty years would routinely refuse permission to reproduce photographs of the relics.” 

In 1956 or 1957 Walter Dodd, son of James Edward Dodd, submitted a sworn statement that his father had found the relics in the basement of a house at 33 Machar Street, Port Arthur; that he saw his father plant the relics at the site of the supposed discovery; and that his earlier statement had been made "under pressure" from his father. Until this point the Royal Ontario Museum had defended the authenticity of the relics and of their supposed discovery. Amid considerable controversy, and following a public enquiry, the museum withdrew the relics from display.

According to American anthropologist Edmund Carpenter, during the twenty-five years between the supposed discovery and the son's admission, successive museum directors and staff members knew much of the 'true' history of the relics. Carpenter stated that the staff knew the collection where the fragments and even knew the name of the ship on which they reached Canada. Carpenter cited this case as an example of his 1961 concept of "identification with institutional power." According to historian F. Donald Logan, the fragments appear to have been imported from Scandinavia in about 1923. They ended up in the Port Arthur area, which had a sizable Norwegian population. It is reported that for more than 30 years museum curators refused to allow photographs to be taken of the fragments and that in the 1990s the museum re-introduced the relics to public display.

See also
Maine penny, Carpenter likened the Beardmore relics to the Maine penny. The actual penny is also considered authentic, yet it may have been 'planted' as well.

Notes

Sources
Footnotes

References

Further reading

 Hunter, Douglas. 2018. Beardmore: The Viking Hoax That Rewrote History. McGill-Queen’s University Press.

Archaeology of Canada
Viking Age in Canada
Archaeological forgeries